No. 300 (Polish) "Land of Masovia" Bomber Squadron was one of several Polish squadrons in the Royal Air Force (RAF) during the Second World War. It was formed as part of an agreement between the Polish Government in Exile and the United Kingdom in 1940. 300 Squadron is now represented by 300 (Isle of Axholme) Squadron of the Royal Air Force Air Cadets, which made the alliance with the Polish Air Force is 1994.

History

Before the outbreak of World War II, the Polish government signed an agreement with the Royal Air Force.  According to the appendix to the Polish-British Alliance, in the event of war with Germany, two Polish bomber squadrons were to be created on British soil.  However, following the German invasion of Poland and subsequent Soviet invasion of Poland, most of the Polish airmen who got to the west were incorporated into the Polish Air Forces being created in France.  It was not until the fall of France that Polish airmen started to arrive in the United Kingdom in large numbers.

Polish evacuees and refugees with experience in aerial warfare were initially housed in a military camp in Eastchurch.

On 1 July 1940, the No. 300 Polish Bomber Squadron was created as the first such Polish units at RAF Bramcote, as a part of the Polish Air Forces in Great Britain. As there were a large number of Polish airmen, often with experience in combat against the Germans from Poland and France, additional bomber squadrons were created by 24 July.

Between 19 July 1940 and 8 May 1945, the crews of the squadron flew 3,891 sorties and spent 20,264 hours in the air.

Initially equipped with Fairey Battle light bombers, the squadron was equipped with Vickers Wellington medium bombers on 16 November 1940. The squadron used several variants, including Mark IC, IV, III and X. In 1941 while the unit was equipped with Wellingtons and flying from Hemswell on 'Gardening' (mining) operations, the squadron's Intelligence Officer was Michael Bentine, later to become well known as an entertainer.  On 5 March 1944 the unit was re-equipped with Avro Lancaster bombers and continued to use that bomber until the end of World War II (Mk I and Mk III variants).

During the war, the squadron took part in most of the notable air offensives in Europe, including attacks on Nazi Germany's Kriegsmarine preparing for Operation Seelöwe, also ships such as the  docked in Brest, France, other naval facilities in Wilhelmshaven and its U-boat facilities in St. Nazaire, Millennium Offensive on large bombing raids on Cologne, bombing raids on V-weapon sites, D-Day, in support of crossing the Rhine, the Battle of the Ruhr, the bombing of Hamburg and the Battle of Berlin.

A number of the crew members were in late 1942 attached to the RAF Tempsford based No. 138 (Special) Squadron RAF as the newly formed Flight C operating the Handley Page Halifax.

The last mission was flown on 25 April 1945 against Adolf Hitler's residence in Berchtesgaden. The unit was disbanded on 2 January 1947, after the Allies withdrew their support for the Polish government in exile.

Details

See also
 Polish Air Forces in Great Britain
 Polish contribution to World War II
 List of RAF squadrons

Notes and references

External links

Bomber Command No. 300 (Polish) Squadron
Photo Gallery of 300 Squadron
Personnel of the Polish Air Force in Great Britain 1940-1947

300
300
Military units and formations established in 1940
Military units and formations disestablished in 1947